In public transport, blocking is the practice of dividing the parts of a scheduled route among vehicles and drivers. It follows the process of dividing the route into trips. In blocking, these trips are pieced together into blocks that are relatively contiguous in space and time. The goal of blocking is to optimize the schedule such that:

 Drivers can start and end their shift in the same place.
 Off-route travel costs are minimized. 
 Layover time is minimized, while allowing drivers adequate time for breaks.
 Vehicles are not switching routes too frequently, which can confuse passengers.

Scheduling (transportation)
Public transport